Eunomius  (died c. 393), one of the leaders of the extreme or "anomoean" Arians, who are sometimes accordingly called Eunomians, was born at Dacora in Cappadocia or at Corniaspa in Pontus. early in the 4th century.

He studied theology at Alexandria under Aetius, and afterwards came under the influence of Eudoxius of Antioch, who ordained him deacon. On the recommendation of Eudoxius, Eunomius was appointed bishop of Cyzicus in 360. Here his free utterance of extreme Arian views led to popular complaints, including those from a number of contemporary writers such as Andronicianus. Eudoxius was compelled, by command of the emperor, Constantius II, to depose Eunomius from the bishopric within a year of his elevation to it.

During the reigns of Julian and Jovian, Eunomius resided in Constantinople in close intercourse with Aetius, consolidating a dissenting party and consecrating bishops. He then went to live at Chalcedon, whence in 367 he was banished to Mauretania for harbouring the rebel Procopius. He was recalled, however, before he reached his destination.

In 383, the emperor Theodosius, who had demanded a declaration of faith from all party leaders, punished Eunomius for continuing to teach his distinctive doctrines, by banishing him to Halmyris in Scythia Minor. He afterwards resided at Chalcedon and at Caesarea in Cappadocia, from which he was expelled by the inhabitants for writing against their bishop Basil. His last days were spent at his birthplace Dacora, where he died about 393.

His writings were held in high reputation by his party and their influence was so much dreaded by the orthodox, that several imperial edicts were issued for their destruction. Consequently, his commentary on the Epistle to the Romans, mentioned by the historian, Socrates Scholasticus and his epistles, mentioned by Philostorgius and Photius, are no longer extant.

His first apologetical work, written probably about 360 or 365, was entirely recovered from the famous refutation of it by Basil of Caesarea. A second apology, written before 379 exists only in the quotations given from it in a refutation by Gregory of Nyssa. The exposition of faith, called forth by the demand of Theodosius for the "council of heresies" in 383, is still extant, and was edited by Valesius in his notes to Socrates of Constantinople, and by Ch. H. G. Rettberg in his Marcelliana.

The teaching of the Anomoean school, led by Aetius and Eunomius, starting from the conception of God as Creator, argued that between the Creator and created there could be no essential, but at best only a moral, resemblance. "As the Unbegotten, God is an absolutely simple being; an act of generation would involve a contradiction of His essence by introducing duality into the Godhead." According to Socrates of Constantinople (24)  and Theodoretos Kyrou (PG 83 420), Eunomius carried his views to a practical issue by altering the baptismal formula. Instead of baptizing in the name of the Trinity by immersing the person in water thrice, he baptized in the death of Christ with only one immersion. This alteration was regarded by the orthodox as so serious that Eunomians on returning to the church were rebaptized, though the Arians were not. The Eunomian heresy was formally condemned by the Council of Constantinople in 381. The sect maintained a separate existence for some time, but gradually fell away owing to internal divisions.

After Eunomius died, Eutropius ordered that Eunomius's body be moved to Tyana and his books be burned.

See also
Christ Pantocrator
Christology

References

Bibliography
 Richard Paul Vaggione (ed.), Eunomius, The Extant Works, New York, Oxford University Press 1987.
 Richard Paul Vaggione, Eunomius of Cyzicus and the Nicene Revolution, New York, Oxford University Press 2000.

4th-century bishops in Roman Anatolia
4th-century Christian theologians
Arian bishops
393 deaths
Year of birth unknown
People declared heretics by the first seven ecumenical councils
Bishops of Cyzicus
4th-century writers